The 1962 SANFL Grand Final was an Australian rules football competition.   beat  58 to 55.

References 

SANFL Grand Finals
SANFL Grand Final, 1962